Brandbilen som försvann is a 1993 Swedish police film about Martin Beck, directed by .

Cast
 Gösta Ekman as Martin Beck
 Kjell Bergqvist as Lennart Kollberg
 Rolf Lassgård as Gunvald Larsson
 Niklas Hjulström as Benny Skacke
 Bernt Ström as Einar Rönn
 Torgny Anderberg as Evald Hammar
 Per-Gunnar Hylén as Kristiansson
 Birger Österberg as Kvant
 Agneta Ekmanner as Greta Hjelm
 Ing-Marie Carlsson as Gun Kollberg
 Sandra Bergqvist as Bodil Kollberg
 Tova Magnusson-Norling as Putte Beck
 Holger Kunkel as Stoiweiler
 Rolf Jenner as Max Carlsson
 Daniela Ziegler as Nadja Kovacs

External links
 
 

1993 films
German crime drama films
Swedish crime drama films
Martin Beck films
1990s Swedish-language films
1990s Swedish films
1990s German films